Aleksandra "Sasha" Belyaeva is a Russian musician and social artist. In 2019 she independently released her debut EP "Greatest Illusion". Vice Magazine reviewed the release calling it "Ultra Visionary", while L'Officiel Magazine labeled Belyaeva as "The Most Anticipated Music Artist of the Year". Sasha is known for her unconventional and secretive performances, having performed only two shows to an invite only audience at The Light Church in Osaka, and the Secret Roxy Suite at Radio City Music Hall in New York. Belyaeva began her career with a Chanel contract and was muse of the late Karl Lagerfeld.  She is the only Russian music artist signed to a major record label in the United States.  Her music is described as atmospheric innovative pop. In 2017, it was reported in American Vogue that Belyaeva introduced the colored hair trend to high-fashion after opening the Sies Marjan fashion show in New York with pastel teal hair. Sasha Belyaeva is credited for leading the music industry into the 4th industrial revolution.

Early life
Belyaeva was born November 28, 1998 in Sosenski, a small mining town in the Kaluga region of the Russian Federation. Belyaeva is the great-granddaughter of St. Nikolai Podeski, Patron Saint of Martyrs. At age 14, she left home to pursue a career in fashion while continuing to study.  Belyaeva was a muse of the late Karl Lagerfeld and began her career with a Chanel contract.  In 2017, it was reported in American Vogue that Belyaeva introduced the colored hair trend to high-fashion after opening the Sies Marjan fashion show in New York with pastel teal hair.

Recognition and Success

Musical career 
Belyaeva decided to leave Elite Model Management and set up her own talent management group with her long time agent. She then took a period of leave to carve a new path in music and art.  Belyaeva is the only Russian music artist signed to a major record label in the United States.  On her most recent EP, she collaborated with Tom Krell (How To Dress Well).  Her debut music video which was directed by Jesse McGowan, combines elements of  Ex-Machina and Alexander McQueen's famed Kate Moss hologram. In 2020, it was confirmed that Belyaeva would be collaborating with Liam Howe on her next release.

Hidden Shows 
In May 2019, Belyaeva hosted her first experiential performance at Church of the Light in Osaka, Japan to a small audience of fans and journalists.  In June 2019, Belyaeva held her second show at Radio City Music Hall, inside the "Roxy Suite", formerly the private apartment of the Hall's impresario, Samuel Roxy Rothafel.  She immersed the attendees by having them sit in the dark room which had been filled with live butterflies under a black light while she performed.

Greatest Illusion EP
In 2019 Belyaeva collaborated with Tom Krell on her debut EP, "Greatest Illusion".  Belyaeva released the EP without label support, stating that her and her management would fund the project on their own to ensure its artistic integrity. The Greatest Illusion EP received wide critical acclaim, being called "Ultra-Visionary" by Vice Magazine.  Her 1990s experimental influences are similar to Bjork, Elizabeth Fraser, Sinead O'Connor and Madonna's.

Social Organizing

Kendall Jenner
In August 2019, after Kendall Jenner reportedly insulted other fashion models by stating in LOVE Magazine "I was never one of those girls who would do like 30 shows a season or whatever the f--k those girls do".  Belyaeva and her hacktivist associates developed a strategy to have Jenner banned from participating in the 2019 New York Fashion Week.  Belyaeva and her accomplices activated the fashion community by creating  and pressured the industry decision makers prior to the event.  They used methods of data and digital conversation analysis to increase engagement to force the fashion leadership to choose between Jenner and the models, while utilizing conventional media such as arranging coverage in the New York Post of the activation. They succeeded in having Jenner skip the entire week, while also earning 30,000 comments on the Instagram page and 700 models signing a petition to not participate in the event with Jenner.

Business

Fourth Turning
Belyaeva has developed a media platform called Fourth Turning, taking its name from the last phase of the Strauss–Howe generational theory.  The Platform and Newsletter shares media analysis, interviews, current art, and political analysis to individuals who sign up to its mailing list via the website.

References

1998 births
Living people
21st-century Russian singers
Alternative rock singers